In mathematics, a Weil group, introduced by , is a modification of the absolute Galois group of a local or global field, used in class field theory.  For such a field F, its Weil group is generally denoted WF. There also exists "finite level" modifications of the Galois groups: if E/F is a finite extension, then the relative Weil group of E/F is WE/F = WF/ (where the superscript c denotes the commutator subgroup).

Weil group of a class formation

The Weil group of a class formation with fundamental classes uE/F ∈ H2(E/F, AF) is a kind of modified Galois group, used in various formulations of class field theory, and in particular in the Langlands program.

If E/F is a normal layer, then the (relative) Weil group WE/F of E/F is the  extension
1 → AF → WE/F → Gal(E/F) → 1
corresponding (using the interpretation of elements in the second group cohomology as central extensions) to the fundamental class uE/F in H2(Gal(E/F), AF). The Weil group of the whole formation is defined to be the inverse limit of the Weil groups of all the layers
G/F, for F an open subgroup of G.

The reciprocity map of the class formation (G, A) induces an isomorphism from AG to the abelianization of the Weil group.

Weil group of an archimedean local field

For archimedean local fields the Weil group is easy to describe: for C it is the group C× of non-zero complex numbers, and for R it is a non-split extension of the Galois group of order 2 by the group of non-zero complex numbers, and can be identified with the subgroup C× ∪ j C× of the non-zero quaternions.

Weil group of a finite field

For finite fields the Weil group is infinite cyclic. A distinguished generator is provided by the Frobenius automorphism. Certain conventions on terminology, such as arithmetic Frobenius, trace back to the fixing here of a generator (as the Frobenius or its inverse).

Weil group of a local field

For a local field of characteristic p > 0, the Weil group is the subgroup of the absolute Galois group of elements that act as a power of the Frobenius automorphism on the constant field (the union of all finite subfields).

For p-adic fields the Weil group is a dense subgroup of the absolute Galois group, and consists of all elements whose image in the Galois group of the residue field is an integral power of the Frobenius automorphism.

More specifically, in these cases, the Weil group does not have the subspace topology, but rather a finer topology. This topology is defined by giving the inertia subgroup its subspace topology and imposing that it be an open subgroup of the Weil group. (The resulting topology is "locally profinite".)

Weil group of a function field

For  global fields of characteristic p>0 (function fields), the Weil group is the subgroup of the absolute Galois group of elements that act as a power of the Frobenius automorphism on the constant field (the union of all finite subfields).

Weil group of a number field

For number fields there is no known "natural" construction of the Weil group without using cocycles to construct the extension. The map from the Weil group to the Galois group is surjective, and its kernel is the connected component of the identity of the Weil group, which is quite complicated.

Weil–Deligne group

In this extension the Weil group acts on the 
additive group by 

where w acts on the residue field of order q as a→a||w|| with ||w|| a power of q.

The local Langlands correspondence for GLn over K (now proved) states that there is a natural bijection between isomorphism classes of irreducible admissible representations of GLn(K) and certain n-dimensional representations of the Weil–Deligne group of K.

The Weil–Deligne group often shows up through its representations. In such cases, the Weil–Deligne group is sometimes taken to be WK × SL(2,C) or WK × SU(2,R), or is simply done away with and Weil–Deligne representations of WK are used instead.

In the archimedean case, the Weil–Deligne group is simply defined to be Weil group.

See also
Langlands group
Shafarevich–Weil theorem

Notes

References

 , reprinted in volume I of his collected papers, 

Class field theory